Alexandre Torreira da Gama Lima Casado (born 4 January 1968) is a Brazilian football manager He is the currently manager Thai League 1 club of Lamphun Warriors.

Playing career
As a player, Alexandre Gama was known as "GAMA", started his career in the youth categories of Fluminense in 1983, where he was champion of Rio de Janeiro in 1988 and of the São Paulo Junior Cup in 1989, from that first conquest, he started to make part of the professional squad and participated in the 1990 Rio Cup triumph, shortly after that triumph he was sold to Bragantino where he was part of the team that won the Paulista championship that year and reached the final of the Brazilian championship in 1991, then went to Europe, where he played until you end your career.

Managerial career
In 2002, he started his career as a coach in the youth division of Fluminense, being Carioca Children's Champion, reaching the interim training of the main team with the departure of Robertinho. He would return to command the Tricolor das Laranjeiras in 2004, assuming the team in place of Ricardo Gomes, when he assumed, interim, the team was in the penultimate position of the Brazilian Championship, it was a team full of renowned players, such as Romário, Edmundo, Ramon, Roger, Leonardo Moura, among others and soon the team started to get right and grew in the competition, Alexandre Gama ended up being effective and managed to finish the competition in 9th place, qualifying for the 2005 South American Cup, an achievement, taking into account the terrible campaign that the team did until he took it on.

After a short stint at Inter de Limeira, he returned to training the youth teams of Fluminense between 2005 and 2006, where he became the World Junior Champion in 2005 in a tournament held in the United Arab Emirates, where he started to work when he took over Al Wahda FC in 2006, back in Brazil in 2008, he commanded two clubs in Rio de Janeiro: Macaé, Volta Redonda where he left and returned Asian football, to coach Gyeongnam FC, from South Korea, where he was also assistant coach of the South Korean team in 2012, during the qualifiers for the 2014 World Cup in Brazil, in a new return to Brazil in 2013, he trained Madureira (Campeonato Carioca and Série D do Brasileiro) and Duque de Caxias, in that period, he was elected the 3rd best coach of the Campeonato Carioca de 2013. He left Brazil again at the beginning of 2014 to train Al-Shahaniya, from Qatar, where he obtained the club's access to the First Division after 33 years of failed attempts, after this feat, he was hired by lo Buriram United where he was twice national champion between 2014 and 2015, won 6 more titles, stayed Buriram until 2016 and in 2017 went to Chiangrai United, with the mission of turning the team into a winning team and winning the first title in its history and in the first year he managed to become champion of the Chang FA Cup and in the following year he won the Kor Royal Cup, left the club at the end of 2018, with 4 titles won and took over the Thai Olympic Team with the mission of taking the country to the Olympiad 2020 in Tokyo, Japan, he was in charge of it for about 6 months, until he received a proposal to take over the Muangthong United team that was doing a terrible campaign in the Thai championship, a rare fact in its history, since it is one of the great of football in the country and gave Alexandre Gama the opportunity to once again show his excellent work and succeed, in addition to saving the team from the unprecedented relegation, to finish the competition in 5th place. Alexandre Gama is the most successful coach in the history of Thai football, with 12 titles won in 14 disputed finals. In 2015, he was elected the best Thai coach among all sports practiced in the country, this award is considered the Oscar of Thai sport, all this prestige makes Alexandre Gama, the biggest name of Thai Football at the moment.

Managerial statistics

Honours

Assistant manager
South Korea
AFC Asian Cup: 2011 (3rd place)

Manager
Al-Wahda
UAE Arabian Gulf League: 2006 (2nd place)
UAE President's Cup: 2007 (2nd place)
AFC Champions League: 2007 (3rd place)

Buriram United
Thai Premier League: 2014, 2015
Thai FA Cup: 2015
Thai League Cup: 2015
Kor Royal Cup: 2015, 2016
Premier Cup: 2016
Mekong Club Championship: 2015

Chiangrai United
Thai FA Cup: 2017, 2018
Thai League Cup: 2018
Thailand Champions Cup: 2018

Individual
Thai Premier League/Thai League 1 Coach of the Month: March–April 2015, July 2019, March 2021, October 2021
Thai Premier League Coach of the Year: 2015

References

External links 
 

1968 births
Living people
Brazilian football managers
Sportspeople from Rio de Janeiro (city)
Fluminense FC managers
Associação Atlética Internacional (Limeira) managers
Al Wahda FC managers
Macaé Esporte Futebol Clube managers
Volta Redonda Futebol Clube managers
Madureira Esporte Clube managers
Alexandre Gama
Daegu FC managers
Alexandre Gama
K League 1 managers
Expatriate football managers in the United Arab Emirates
Expatriate football managers in Thailand
Expatriate football managers in South Korea
Brazilian expatriate football managers
Al-Shahania Sports Club managers
Alexandre Gama